The ACBL King or Queen of Bridge is a graduating high school senior annually designated by the American Contract Bridge League. Currently a $2000 scholarship accompanies the title.

The King or Queen is the high school senior in North America (US, Canada, Mexico, and Bermuda) with the "best record in bridge". Students now formally enter the annual contest and identify their qualifications. Beside outstanding performance in bridge tournaments, the winner is commonly cited for sportsmanship and for "bridge activities such as teaching, directing, and unit/district participation".

The King of Bridge was established in 1973 by Homer Shoop of Indiana as a prize for the high school senior with the greatest number of ACBL master points. The second and third winners, Jeff Meckstroth and Bobby Levin in 1974 and 1975, won the 1981 Bermuda Bowl as United States teammates; Levin was the youngest person to be a world champion at bridge. Several other Kings and Queens have become leading expert players.

Winners

 1973, J Merril
 1974, Jeff Meckstroth
 1975, Bobby Levin
 1976, Warren Spector
 1977, Marc Franklin
 1978, Matthew K. Franklin
 1979, Regina Barnes
 1980, Tony Marks
 1981, Doug Levene, Steve Cochran
 1982, Steve Weinstein
 1983, Billy Hsieh
 1984, James Munday
 1985, Adair Gellman
 1986, Martha Benson ‡
 1987, Richard Pavlicek, Jr.
 1988, Holly Zullo
 1989, Brad Moss
 1990, Eric Sutherland
 1991, Andrew Moss
 1992, Frederic Pollack
 1993, Eric Greco
 1994, Sam Hirschman
 1995, Tony Melucci
 1996, Kent Mignocchi
 1997, Joel Wooldridge
 1998, Josh Heller
 1999, Ari Greenberg
 2000, Gavin Wolpert
 2001, Erin Anderson
 2002, John Kranyak †
 2003, Scottie Waldron Jr.
 2004, Rob Glickman
 2005, David Banh
 2006, Sam Katz ‡
 2007, Andrew Dubay
 2008, Jeremy Koegel
 2009, Nick Flores
 2010, Tom Walsh, Adam Grossack
 2011, Blake Sanders 
 2012, Murphy Green
 2013, John Altman
 2014, Adam Kaplan, Allison Hunt †
 2015, Amber Lin
 2016, Burke Snowden
 2017, Richard Jeng
 2018, Reese Koppel 
 2019, Louis Beauchet 
 2020, Bo Han Zhu
 2021, Tammy Leon Molina
 2021, Arthur Zhou

 ‡ 2006 King of Bridge Sam Katz is the son of 1986 Queen of Bridge Martha Benson. They are the only recipients related as child and parent.

† 2002 King of Bridge John Kranyak married 2014 Queen of Bridge Allison Hunt on June 16, 2018

References

+
Awards honoring children or youth
Awards established in 1973